Vemula Prashanth Reddy  is an Indian politician currently serving as the Minister of Roads, Buildings and Legislative Affairs & Housing Department of Telangana since 8 September 2019. He is a Member of Telangana Legislative Assembly from Balkonda constituency from 2 June 2014.

He is the member of the Telangana Rashtra Samithi (TRS) Party and the Member of the Legislative Assembly (MLA) of the Balkonda constituency of Nizamabad district, Telangana.

References

Living people
1966 births
Indian politicians
Telangana MLAs 2018–2023